A Woman Redeemed is a 1927 British crime film directed by Sinclair Hill and starring Joan Lockton, Brian Aherne and James Carew. The screenplay concerns a secret society that tries to steal sensitive information. The film was based on the short story "The Fining Pot is for Silver", written by F. Britten Austin that was originally published on the June 1924 issue of The Strand Magazine.

Premise
A secret society uses a young woman to try to steal some sensitive information.

Cast
 Joan Lockton as Felice Annaway
 Brian Aherne as Geoffrey Maynefleet
 Stella Arbenina as Marta
 James Carew as Count Kalvestro
 Gordon Hopkirk as Angelo
 Frank Denton as Bug
 Robert English as Colonel Mather

References

Bibliography
 Low, Rachael. History of the British Film, 1918-1929. George Allen & Unwin, 1971.

External links
 

1927 films
British silent feature films
1927 crime films
Films directed by Sinclair Hill
Stoll Pictures films
British black-and-white films
British crime films
1920s English-language films
1920s British films